Wang Su-yun (born 19 February 1953) is a Taiwanese politician.

Early life

Political career
Wang served on the Pingtung County Council for four terms prior to her election to the Legislative Yuan in 1989. She returned to the national legislature in 1996 and served until 1999. After she completed her second term as a lawmaker, Wang contested an open seat on the Kuomintang Central Standing Committee in 2000. Wang, Ho, and 27 others were indicted in 2004 and charged with violating the Securities Transaction Law. Both Wang and Ho left Taiwan for China in 2010; the ongoing legal action continued into 2019.

References

1953 births
Living people
20th-century Taiwanese women politicians
Members of the 1st Legislative Yuan in Taiwan
Members of the 3rd Legislative Yuan
Kuomintang Members of the Legislative Yuan in Taiwan
Miaoli County Members of the Legislative Yuan
Taiwanese politicians convicted of corruption
Fugitives wanted by Taiwan
Taiwanese expatriates in China
Politicians of the Republic of China on Taiwan from Pingtung County
Spouses of Taiwanese politicians